Rhammatocerus is a genus of grasshoppers in the subfamily Gomphocerinae and the tribe Scyllinini. There are about 16 described species in Rhammatocerus, including R. schistocercoides, the "Mato Grosso locust".

Species
These 16 species belong to the genus Rhammatocerus:

 Rhammatocerus alticola (Hebard, 1923)
 Rhammatocerus brasiliensis (Bruner, 1904)
 Rhammatocerus brunneri (Giglio-Tos, 1895)
 Rhammatocerus cyanipes (Fabricius, 1775)
 Rhammatocerus guerrai Assis-Pujol, 1997
 Rhammatocerus palustris Carbonell, 1988
 Rhammatocerus peragrans (Stål, 1861)
 Rhammatocerus pictus (Bruner, 1900)
 Rhammatocerus pratensis (Bruner, 1904)
 Rhammatocerus pseudocyanipes Assis-Pujol, 1997
 Rhammatocerus salinus (Bruner, 1904)
 Rhammatocerus schistocercoides (Rehn, 1906)
 Rhammatocerus suffusus (Rehn, 1906)
 Rhammatocerus varipes (Bruner, 1905)
 Rhammatocerus viatorius (Saussure, 1861) (traveller grasshopper)
 Rhammatocerus victori Alves Dos Santos & Assis-Pujol, 2003

References

Further reading

 
 
 

 
Articles created by Qbugbot